Love and the Weather is an album by flautist Herbie Mann and Orchestra released on the Bethlehem label in 1956.

Track listing 
 "Love and the Weather" (Irving Berlin) - 3:50
 "But Beautiful" (Jimmy Van Heusen, Johnny Burke) - 2:56
 "Spring Can Really Hang You Up the Most" (Tommy Wolf, Fran Landesman) - 3:31
 "I'm Glad There Is You" (Jimmy Dorsey, Paul Madeira) - 3:22
 "A Sinner Kissed an Angel" (Mack David, Richard M. Jones, Ray Joseph) - 3:13
 "High on a Windy Hill" (Alex Kramer, Joan Whitney) - 3:35
 "Ill Wind" (Harold Arlen, Ted Koehler) - 3:47
 "For Heaven's Sake" (Elise Bretton, Sherman Edwards, Donald Meyer) - 3:21
 "Autumn Nocturne" (Kim Gannon, Josef Myrow) - 4:21
 "Moon Love" (Mack David, Mack Davis, Andre Kostelanetz) - 2:43
 "Morning Side of the Mountain" (Larry Lawrence Stock, Dick Manning) - 3:24
 "Like Someone in Love" (Van Heusen, Burke) - 2:59

Personnel 
Herbie Mann - flute
Joe Puma - guitar 
Milt Hinton (tracks 1-6), Whitey Mitchell (tracks 7-12) - bass
Don Lamond (tracks 1-6), Herb Wasserman (track 7-12) - drums
Unidentified orchestra arranged and conducted by Ralph Burns (tracks 1-6) and Frank Hunter (tracks 7-12)

References 

Herbie Mann albums
1956 albums
Bethlehem Records albums